Laphria franciscana is a species of robber flies in the family Asilidae.

References

franciscana
Articles created by Qbugbot
Insects described in 1878